The Cornish Guardian (founded 1901) is a weekly newspaper in Cornwall, England, UK, which is part of the Cornwall & Devon Media group. Its head office is in Truro and it is published in seven separate editions:
Bodmin edition
Lostwithiel and Fowey edition
Newquay edition 
North Cornwall edition
South East Cornwall edition
St Austell edition 
Wadebridge edition

In 2012, Local World acquired Cornwall & Devon Media owner Northcliffe Media from Daily Mail and General Trust. In October 2015, Trinity Mirror (Now Reach plc) reached agreement with Local World's other shareholders to buy the company.

See also 

 List of newspapers in the United Kingdom

References

External links

Newspapers published in Cornwall
Northcliffe Media
Newspapers established in 1901
Reach plc
1901 establishments in England